Haloferax chudinovii is a species of archaea in the family Haloferacaceae. The species was described in 2013.

References 

Halobacteria
Taxa described in 2013